Qazi Salahuddin was a former Pakistani Olympian & field hockey player from Pakistan. He played for Pakistan's National Field Hockey Team from 1967–69. He was part of Pakistan National Team in 1968 Summer Olympics where Pakistan team took the gold medal after defeating Australia in the Final by 2-1 in Mexico City, Mexico. Salahuddin has also served as coach of Khyber Pakhtunkhwa women hockey team.

See also
 Pakistan at the 1968 Summer Olympics
 List of Pakistani field hockey players

References

External links
 

Olympic field hockey players of Pakistan
Pakistani male field hockey players
Field hockey players at the 1968 Summer Olympics
Olympic gold medalists for Pakistan
Olympic medalists in field hockey
Possibly living people
Year of birth missing
Medalists at the 1968 Summer Olympics